is a junction railway station in the city of Yatomi, Aichi Prefecture, Japan, operated by Central Japan Railway Company (JR Tōkai) and the private railway company, Nagoya Railway (Meitetsu). The station's elevation is 0.93 m below sea level, the lowest among all above-ground stations of JR Group.

Lines
Yatomi Station is served by the Kansai Main Line, and is located 16.4  kilometers from the starting point of the line at Nagoya Station.

Station layout
The station has a single side platform used by the Kansai Main Line, and a single island platform, shared by the Kansai Main Line and the Meitetsu Bisai Line, connected by a footbridge. The station is staffed. This is one of the few stations operated by Meitetsu that does not accept Tranpass magnetic fare cards.

Platforms

Adjacent stations

|-
!colspan=5|Central Japan Railway Company (JR Central)

|-
!colspan=5|Nagoya Railroad

Station history
It was renamed to its present name on November 7, 1895. The Kansai Railroad was nationalized in 1907 and became the Kansai Line of the Japanese Government Railways (JGR). On April 3, 1898, Yatomi Station also became a terminal of a section of line operated by the Bisai Railroad, which was bought by Meitetsu on August 1, 1925, and in the process became a station on the Meitetsu Bisai Line as it is today. The JGR became the JNR (Japan National Railways) after World War II. Freight operations were discontinued from October 1, 1980. With the privatization of the JNR on April 1, 1987, the station came under the control of JR Central. Automatic wicket gates using the TOICA smart card were installed from October 25, 2006.

Station numbering was introduced to the section of the Kansai Main Line operated JR Central in March 2018; Yatomi Station was assigned station number CI05.

Surrounding area
Yatomi City Hall

See also
 List of Railway Stations in Japan

References

External links

 Official home page (Meitetsu)

Railway stations in Japan opened in 1895
Kansai Main Line
Stations of Nagoya Railroad
Stations of Central Japan Railway Company
Railway stations in Aichi Prefecture
Yatomi, Aichi